Dragonriders of Pern is a board game that originated in the United States in 1983 created by Anne McCaffrey. The plot is based on the series Dragonriders of Pern.

Reception
Nic Grecas reviewed Dragonriders of Pern for White Dwarf #52, giving it an overall rating of 4 out of 10, and stated that "This is a game which lacks those crucial ingredients - enjoyment and excitement. In a game which has these, almost anything else can be forgiven, eg rotten artwork, unclear rules, complex and unwieldy game mechanics, high price, or 'historical inaccuracy'. In their absence, even the most lavishly illustrated, innovative game is a failure to be played once and no more."

Reviews
Fantasy Gamer #4
Science Fiction Chronicle

References

Mayfair Games games